Palaver may refer to:
Palaver (custom), a form of local conflict resolution in different African countries
"Palaver", meaning a long discussion or procedure, from the Portuguese word "palavra". See List of English words of Portuguese origin.
Palaver Point, on the west side of Two Hummock Island, in the Palmer Archipelago
Palaver (1926 film), by Geoffrey Barkas, the first Nigerian feature film
Palaver (1969 film), a Dutch-language Belgian fantasy film directed by Emile Degelin
Palaver sauce, a type of stew eaten in West Africa

See also
 Palava (disambiguation)
 Pallava (disambiguation)
 Polava, a river of Saxony, Germany and of the Czech Republic